Baixas is a commune in the Pyrénées-Orientales department in southern France.

Geography

Localisation 
Baixas is located in the canton of Le Ribéral and in the arrondissement of Perpignan.

Government and politics

Mayors

Population

Notable people 
 Andrzej Szpilman (1956-), Polish composer living partly in Baixas.

See also
Communes of the Pyrénées-Orientales department

References

External links
Official site

Communes of Pyrénées-Orientales